There are three lakes in Naltar Valley known as Naltar Lakes or Bashkiri Lakes at altitudes ranging from . In one of the three lakes colour of water is green (due to grasses grown inside the lake) while the second has blue colored water and the third has azure colored water. The road up to the lakes is a dirt road alongside a stream flowing down the valley. The lakes are surrounded by dense pine forests. The best time to visit the lakes is from May to October. During the winter, it becomes almost impossible to reach the lake by vehicle due to the heavy snowfall in the Naltar Valley.

See also
List of lakes in Pakistan
Nomal Valley
Danyor
Gilgit City
Bagrot Valley

References

Lakes of Gilgit-Baltistan
Gilgit District